Teofisto "Tito" Tayko Guingona Jr. (born July 4, 1928) is a Filipino politician and diplomat who served as the 11th vice president of the Philippines from 2001 to 2004, during the first term of President Gloria Macapagal Arroyo. Born in San Juan, Rizal (now a part of Metro Manila), Teofisto is a graduate of Ateneo de Manila University, where he was a working student.

He was appointed as chairman of the Commission on Audit by then newly installed President Corazon C. Aquino in 1986 until 1987, when he was elected as a senator of the Philippines under the coalition of Lakas ng Bayan, led by Aquino. While a senator, he also served as the director and chairman of the Mindanao Development Authority and the Mindanao Labor Management Advisory Council. He won in the reelections in 1992 and became the majority leader a year after, but his term ended prematurely when newly elected President Fidel V. Ramos appointed him as executive secretary from 1993 until 1995 and as justice secretary from 1995 until 1998. He was re-elected to the Senate again as a minority leader from 1998 until 2001.

Guingona was appointed as vice president of the Philippines and secretary of foreign affairs by President Arroyo, after she was automatically promoted to the presidency from vice presidency after President Joseph "Erap" Estrada's ousting in EDSA II, making Guingona the only vice president who was not nationally elected to the position. When Guingona's term ended, he decided not to seek a full term election at the 2004 Philippine presidential election and was succeeded by Noli de Castro.

Early life and career
Guingona was born on July 4, 1928, in San Juan, Rizal. His father, Teofisto Guingona, Sr., was a former assemblyman, senator, judge and commissioner from Guimaras, Iloilo. His mother, Josefa Tayko, is of Siaton, Negros Oriental. He grew up in the provinces Agusan, Lanao, and Misamis Oriental, where he completed his elementary schooling with honors in Ateneo de Cagayan. He pursued his studies at the Ateneo de Manila University as a working student, teaching history and political science while taking up courses in law and economics. He took up special studies in Public Administration, Economics, Sociology and Audit, in addition to playing a role in the new Aquila Legis fraternity (Second Batch 1950) becoming the most honorable Praeses or "bossman" in 1952-53 after founding bossman Joaquin Misa in 1949. After graduation, he went into business and became a governor of the Development Bank of the Philippines and president of the Chamber of Commerce of the Philippines.

Early political career
Guingona was a delegate to the 1971 Constitutional Convention and, when martial law was declared in 1972 by President Ferdinand Marcos, he resisted the abuses of the regime, serving as a human rights lawyer. He founded SANDATA and became the honorary chairman of BANDILA, two mass-based organizations dedicated to social and economic reforms. Because of his opposition to martial rule he was jailed twice, first in 1972 and then in 1978. When Marcos was ousted in 1986 as a result of the People Power Revolution, newly installed President Corazon Aquino appointed Guingona as chairman of the Commission on Audit, where he gained renown as a graft buster.

Senate of the Philippines (1987–1993; 1998–2001)
Guingona was first elected to the Senate in 1987 under the Aquino-backed Lakas ng Bayan coalition. He was elected as Senate president pro tempore in 1987 and majority leader in 1990. Additionally, he served as director and chairman of the Mindanao Development Authority and the Mindanao Labor Management Advisory Council.

In 1992, Guingona ran for reelection under the Laban ng Demokratikong Pilipino of Speaker of the House Ramon Mitra Jr. and won, placing 14th in the senatorial race. He became the majority leader again in 1993, but his term in the Senate was cut short when President Fidel V. Ramos appointed him as executive secretary the same year. In 1998, he was elected again to the Senate under Lakas-NUCD and was elected as minority leader. Guingona spoke out against the anomalies in the administration of President Joseph Estrada and was among the first to call for his resignation. On January 17, 2001, he was one of the senators who voted in favor of opening an envelope that was said to contain incriminating evidence against Estrada. The final vote was 11–10, in favor of keeping the envelope closed, which further fueled anti-Estrada sentiments that led to another uprising on EDSA. When Estrada was ousted, Guingona emerged as the top choice for a successor to Vice President Gloria Macapagal Arroyo, who succeeded Estrada as president.

Executive secretary (1993–1995) and secretary of justice (1995–1998)
President Fidel V. Ramos appointed Guingona as executive secretary in 1993, replacing Edelmiro Amante, who resigned. In 1995, Guingona was appointed as justice secretary. As justice secretary, he rejuvenated the Witness Protection Program and established the Prosecution Academy. He also implemented the Katarungang Pambarangay, or the Barangay Justice System, and heightened public awareness of the Barangay Justice Program. He also held, in a concurrent capacity, the chairmanship of the Presidential Anti-Crime Commission.

Vice presidency (2001–2004)

Following the Second EDSA Revolution in January 2001 that overthrew President Joseph Estrada, Guingona was appointed as vice president of the Philippines by Arroyo, who succeeded Estrada to the presidency, on February 7. Guingona is the only vice president who was not nationally elected to the position. He is also the oldest person to have held the position, being appointed at the age of 72. He also concurrently served as secretary of foreign affairs. During his time as vice-president, he was often at odds with Arroyo, particularly over foreign policy. He resigned as secretary of foreign affairs on July 2, 2002. He also resigned from Lakas-NUCD on October 3, 2003. In the 2004 Philippine elections, Guingona did not seek a full term election and was succeeded by Noli de Castro. In that election, he supported the presidential and vice-presidential bids of opposition candidates Fernando Poe Jr. and Senator Loren Legarda, respectively.

Post vice presidency
After the defeat of his candidate, Fernando Poe Jr., Guingona supported the administration of Arroyo again by accepting the position of ambassador to China. He resigned as ambassador and joined the opposition again at the height of the Hello Garci scandal, a political scandal involving Arroyo's alleged rigging of the 2004 presidential elections. On November 29, 2007, Guingona participated in the Manila Peninsula rebellion, a mutiny led by Senator Antonio Trillanes and Brigader General Danilo Lim that called for Arroyo's resignation. He was arrested afterward, but on December 13, 2007, the Makati Regional Trial Court dismissed rebellion cases against him. Guingona wrote his 346-page book Fight for the Filipino, which contains his memoirs. It was launched on July 4, 2008, his 80th birthday, at the Manila Hotel.

Personal life
Guingona is married to Ruth de Lara, a former mayor and vice mayor of Gingoog, Misamis Oriental. His son, Teofisto III, is a former senator of the Philippines while his daughter, Stella Marie, also served as mayor of Gingoog until 2019.

References

Further reading

External links
Office of the Vice President of the Philippines - Guingona (2001-2004)
Senate of the Philippines - Teofisto Guingona's Profile

|-

1928 births
Living people
Ambassadors of the Philippines to China
Arroyo administration cabinet members
Ateneo de Manila University alumni
Chairpersons of constitutional commissions of the Philippines
Executive Secretaries of the Philippines
Hiligaynon people
Laban ng Demokratikong Pilipino politicians
Lakas–CMD (1991) politicians
Majority leaders of the Senate of the Philippines
Marcos martial law victims
Minority leaders of the Senate of the Philippines
People from Misamis Oriental
People from Rizal
People from San Juan, Metro Manila
Presidents pro tempore of the Senate of the Philippines
Corazon Aquino administration personnel
Ramos administration cabinet members
Secretaries of Foreign Affairs of the Philippines
Secretaries of Justice of the Philippines
Senators of the 8th Congress of the Philippines
Senators of the 9th Congress of the Philippines
Senators of the 11th Congress of the Philippines
Vice presidents of the Philippines
Visayan people